Yeniseyskoye is a rural locality (a selo) and the administrative center of Yeniseysky Selsoviet, Biysky District, Altai Krai, Russia. The population was 1,457 as of 2016. There are 24 streets.

Geography 
Yeniseyskoye is located on the Biya River, 27 km east of Biysk (the district's administrative centre) by road. Maloyeniseyskoye is the nearest rural locality.

References 

Rural localities in Biysky District